Robert Zurbriggen (16 March 1917 – 21 April 1952) was a Swiss cross-country skier and biathlete who competed in the 1948 Winter Olympics.

Zurbriggen was born in Saas-Fee. In 1948 he was leader of the Swiss relay team which finished fifth in the 4x10 km relay competition. At this time he had the military rank of an Oberleutnant. In the 18 km event he finished 26th.

He also participated in the demonstration event, military patrol (precursor to biathlon). He was leader of the Swiss team, which finished first in the military patrol event (R. Zurbriggen, his brother H. Zurbriggen, Andenmatten, Vouardoux). In 1947 he, Karl Hischier, Karl Bricker and Andenmatten also won the revenge race in Oslo.

As a mountain guide of a glacier tour he had a fatal accident in 1952.

External links
profile

References 

1917 births
1952 deaths
Swiss male cross-country skiers
Swiss military patrol (sport) runners
Olympic cross-country skiers of Switzerland
Olympic biathletes of Switzerland
Cross-country skiers at the 1948 Winter Olympics
Military patrol competitors at the 1948 Winter Olympics
People from Visp (district)
Mountaineering deaths
Swiss military officers
Sport deaths in Switzerland
Sportspeople from Valais